Rubini Sambanthan is a Malaysian Indian model, actress and beauty pageant titleholder who was crowned Miss International Malaysia 2014. She went to compete in Miss International 2014 held in Tokyo, Japan

Early life
Rubini was born in Kajang, Selangor. She is of Malaysian Indian and Nepalese descent. She is fluent in English and Malay. She graduated in finance and accounting.

Career

Pageantry

Miss World Malaysia 2013
Rubini's first public appearance came to when she was chosen as one of the finalists to compete in Miss World Malaysia 2013.

Miss International Malaysia 2014
She became known after she won Miss International Malaysia title, specifically Miss International Malaysia 2014. She earns her right to compete as Malaysian representative at the Miss International 2014.

Miss International 2014
As Miss International Malaysia 2014, she represent Malaysia at the 54th edition of Miss International held in Tokyo, Japan but unfortunately she was unplaced. She was chosen as one of the Best Speakers for the forum section.

Miss Tourism Sri Lanka International 2016
In 2016, Rubini was appointed to represent Malaysia at Miss Tourism Sri Lanka International 2016. She eventually placed as 1st Runner-up and won a subsidiary title for Best National Costume.

Modeling

Asia’s Next Top Model
She was scouted for the sixth cycle of the competition, becoming one of the 14 contestants. Rubini was placed in the top nine and was eliminated from the competition in the fourth episode.

Post-Asia’s Next Top Model
In conjunction with Malaysia's Hari Merdeka celebration, Rubini was featured in Sephora “MY Face, My Pride” Merdeka campaign alongside Olympian Pandelela Rinong, graffiti artist Kenji Chai, and Ally Mukhriz who represents the working professionals while being a renowned presence in the social sphere. In 2019,she debuted her first acting gig as Laura in Devoted with legendary actor Faizal Hussein. Her current project Ben and Bella for TV3 as Jasmin shows Rubini’s credibility as an actress.

Awards and nominations

References

External links
 Rubini S. BASE Model Management

1991 births
Living people
Malaysian beauty pageant winners
Malaysian female models
People from Selangor
Top Model contestants
Malaysian people of Indian descent
Malaysian people of Nepalese descent
Miss International 2014 delegates